Andrei Krylov (born 1956) is a Russian mathematician, specialist in mathematical methods of image processing, Professor, Dr. Sc., a professor at the Faculty of Computer Science at the Moscow State University.

He defended the thesis Mathematical modeling and computer analysis of liquid metal systems for the degree of Doctor of Physical and Mathematical Sciences (2009).

He is the author of three books and more than 140 scientific articles.

References

Bibliography

External links
 Laboratory of Mathematical Methods of Image Processing
 MSU CMC
 Scientific works of Andrei Krylov
 Scientific works of Andrei Krylov

Russian computer scientists
Russian mathematicians
Living people
1956 births
Academic staff of Moscow State University
Moscow State University alumni